Larawan: A Special Drama Engagement is a 2001 Philippine television drama anthology broadcast by GMA Network. The show features different a lead star every month. It premiered on February 14, 2001. The show concluded on December 26, 2001 with a total of 55 episodes.

Cast

 G. Toengi (February 14, 2001 - March 7, 2001)
 Ruffa Gutierrez (March 14, 2001 - April 4, 2001)
 Rufa Mae Quinto (April 11, 2001 - May 2, 2001)
 Donita Rose (May 9, 2001 - May 30, 2001)
 Assunta de Rossi (June 6, 2001 - June 27, 2001)
 Dingdong Dantes (July 4, 2001 - July 25, 2001)
 Pops Fernandez (August 1, 2001 - August 29, 2001)
 Antoinette Taus (September 5, 2001 - September 26, 2001)
 Cesar Montano (October 3, 2001 - October 31, 2001)
 Angelu de Leon (November 7, 2001 - November 28, 2001)
 Albert Martinez (December 5, 2001 - December 26, 2001)

Accolades

References

2001 Philippine television series debuts
2001 Philippine television series endings
Filipino-language television shows
GMA Network original programming
Philippine anthology television series